A cabin boy or ship's boy is a boy (in the sense of low-ranking young male employee, not always a minor in the juridical sense) who waits on the officers and passengers of a ship, especially running errands for the captain. The modern merchant navy successor to the cabin boy is the steward's assistant.

Duties
Cabin boys were usually 13–16 years old, but sometimes as young as 8, and also helped the cook in the ship's kitchen and carried buckets of food from the ship's kitchen to the forecastle where the ordinary seamen ate. They would have to scramble up the rigging into the yards whenever the sails had to be trimmed. They would occasionally stand watch like other crewmen or act as helmsman in good weather, holding the wheel to keep the ship steady on her course. They could be found on pirate ships sometimes.

Royal Navy officers
Several prominent British Royal Navy officers began their career as cabin boys. The list includes officers that achieved an admiralty rank before 1801. 
 Admiral of the Fleet Sir William Parker, 1st Baronet of Shenstone
 Admiral of the Fleet Sir Cloudsley Shovell
 Admiral Sir Francis Drake
 Admiral Sir John Hawkins
 Admiral (General) Richard Deane
 Admiral (Colonel) William Rainsborough
 Admiral Sir William Penn
 Vice Admiral Lord Nelson
 Vice Admiral Sir William Batten
 Vice Admiral Sir John Lawson
 Vice Admiral (Captain) Badilow
 Vice Admiral Sir Thomas Tiddeman
 Vice Admiral (Captain) James Peacock
 Vice Admiral (Captain) William Goodsonn
 Vice Admiral Sir Christopher Myngs
 Vice Admiral Sir John Harman
 Rear Admiral Sir John Berry
 Rear Admiral Sir Richard Stainer
 Rear Admiral (Captain) Anthony Houlding
 Rear Admiral (Captain) Deacons
 Rear Admiral (Captain) Robert Sansum

Notable cabin boys
Matthew Henson, cabin boy at the age of 12. Went on to accompany Robert Peary in his Arctic explorations.  Allegedly the first person to reach the North Pole. 
John Anglin, cabin boy who received the Medal of Honor during the American Civil War.
Commodore John Barry, Barry would go on to serve in the American Revolutionary War and is known as "the Father of the American Navy."
Hobart Bosworth, cabin boy on the Sovereign of the Seas who became a famous actor.
Christian Franzen, cabin boy who served in the Wisconsin State Assembly. 
Michael Healy, cabin boy in 1854, who became the first African-American to command a ship of the United States Government.
James Machon, cabin boy who received the Medal of Honor during the American Civil War.
Thomas Nickerson, cabin boy on the Essex who later wrote about the shipwreck and subsequent three months of survival at sea.
Frederick Pabst, cabin boy at the age of 14 and Great Lakes Captain at 21. Later became an American brewing pioneer and led Pabst Brewing Company into prominence in the late 1800s.
John H. Paynter, cabin boy who enlisted in 1884, later became a real estate developer and writer of poetry and nonfiction, including the acclaimed Fugitive of the Pearl (1930).
John Ward Westcott, cabin boy at the age of 13 and a Great Lakes captain at 20. He developed a special vessel mail system.

Popular culture

Cori, de Scheepsjongen ("Cori the Cabin Boy"), a comics series by Belgian artist Bob de Moor about a cabin boy working for the Verenigde Oostindische Compagnie in the 16th century. 
Cabin Boy, a 1994 film.
"Cabin Boy" a song by Tom Robinson from the 1984/1997 Castaway Northwest CNWVP006 album War Baby.
Captain Pugwash, a British television children's animated series about a hapless captain and his crew; Tom, the cabin boy, is depicted as the most intelligent member of the crew.
Treasure Island, where the main character Jim serves as a cabin boy on the board the ship the Hispaniola.
"Cabin Boy", a short story by Damon Knight.
Renaissance Festival, The Cabin Boys, Pirate Fire Comedy act from Minnesota.

References

Personal care and service occupations
Marine occupations
Obsolete occupations
Child labour
Gendered occupations